Concierto de almas, is a Mexican telenovela produced by Televisa and originally transmitted by Telesistema Mexicano.

Cast 
Marga López
Germán Robles
Juan Ferrara
Erna Martha Bauman

References

External links 

Mexican telenovelas
Televisa telenovelas
Spanish-language telenovelas
1969 telenovelas
1969 Mexican television series debuts
1969 Mexican television series endings